The Silas W. and Elizabeth Crane House is a historic house in Harrison, Idaho. It was built in 1891 for settlers Silas W. Crane and his wife Elizabeth. The Cranes lived here with their three sons, Addison, Edwin and William. It was first designed in the Queen Anne architectural style, and later redesigned in the American Craftsman style. It has been listed on the National Register of Historic Places since December 9, 1999.

References

American Foursquare architecture
National Register of Historic Places in Kootenai County, Idaho
Houses completed in 1891